The Arcade Depot was the main Southern Pacific Railroad passenger railway station, from 1888 until 1914. It was located on Alameda Street, between 5th and 6th Streets, in Los Angeles, California.

History

The land for the station was furnished to Southern Pacific by the City of Los Angeles, which was intended to lure the railroad to town. The Victorian style wooden station was completed in 1888. It was located on the site of the former orange groves of William Wolfskill, on the east side of Downtown Los Angeles towards the Los Angeles River. A palm tree was replanted outside the station during its opening year.

The station replaced the Southern Pacific River Station as the main L.A. passenger terminal, which was located next to a freight yard farther outside of downtown L.A.

In addition to mainline steam trains, the depot was also served by Pacific Electric Red Cars.

The Arcade Depot was closed in 1914, when the Southern Pacific opened the Los Angeles Central Station, in eastern Downtown Los Angeles. The old depot was demolished soon after to make room for new outdoor platforms serving Central Station.

References

External links

 Los Angeles Train Time Departure timetable from May 1892

Railway stations in Los Angeles
Buildings and structures in Downtown Los Angeles
Demolished buildings and structures in Los Angeles
Demolished railway stations in the United States
History of Los Angeles
Landmarks in Los Angeles
Transit centers in the United States
Railway stations in the United States opened in 1888
1888 establishments in California
19th century in Los Angeles
Railway stations closed in 1914
1914 disestablishments in California
1880s architecture in the United States
Victorian architecture in California
Former Southern Pacific Railroad stations in California
Pacific Electric stations